Harold Himmel Velde (April 1, 1910 – September 1, 1985) was a Republican American political figure from Illinois.  While United States Congressman for Illinois's 18th congressional district he was chairman of the House Un-American Activities Committee between 1953 and 1955.

Background

Velde was born on a farm near Parkland, Tazewell County, Illinois.  After attending rural grade and high school, he attended Bradley University from 1927 to 1929, then graduated from Northwestern University in 1931 and from University of Illinois Law School in 1937.

Career

Velde was admitted to the bar as a lawyer, taking up practice in Pekin, Illinois.

Velde served as a private in the United States Army Signal Corps in 1942 until becoming a special agent for the FBI's sabotage and counterespionage division in 1943, staying there until 1946.

In 1946, he was then elected judge for Tazewell County, Illinois and remained judge until 1949.

In 1948, Velde won election to the United States House of Representatives, taking his seat on January 3, 1949.

In the 83rd United States Congress, he became chairman of the House Un-American Activities Committee after the previous chairman, J. Parnell Thomas of New Jersey, went to prison for taking kickbacks.

Velde did not run in 1956, and ended his four terms in Congress on January 3, 1957.

After Congress, Velde returned to practicing law: He was a lawyer in Urbana, Illinois and Washington, D.C. until May 5, 1969.  He became a regional counsel for the General Services Administration in Lansing, Illinois in 1969.

Personal and death

In 1974, he retired to Sun City, Arizona, where he died on September 1, 1985.  His ashes were interred in Pekin, Illinois, at Lakeside Cemetery.

See also
 List of members of the House Un-American Activities Committee

References

External links
 

1910 births
1985 deaths
People from Tazewell County, Illinois
Northwestern University alumni
University of Illinois College of Law alumni
American people of Dutch descent
Federal Bureau of Investigation agents
United States Army soldiers
United States Army personnel of World War II
Military personnel from Illinois
Illinois lawyers
Illinois state court judges
Republican Party members of the United States House of Representatives from Illinois
Arizona Republicans
20th-century American lawyers
20th-century American politicians
People from Sun City, Arizona
People from Pekin, Illinois
20th-century American judges
American anti-communists